"Something" is the debut single of Belgian music group Lasgo. It was first released on 15 June 2001 as the lead single from their debut album, Some Things (2001). It became a hit in the band's native Belgium, peaking at  5 in the Flanders region, and reached the top 10 in several mainland European countries. On 25 February 2002, it was released in the United Kingdom, reaching No. 4 on the UK Singles Chart. It also peaked within the top 40 in the United States. In 2013, the song was re-released with new vocals from Jelle instead of Evi. The remade song also features vocals from British pop singer Taylor Jones.

Chart performance
In Spain, the single was the best selling vinyl at the distributor the week it was released, reaching number 14 on the country's chart. In October 2001, "Something" peaked at number seven on the Dutch charts, while in Germany it entered the charts at number 11. On 25 February 2002, Positiva Records released "Something" in the United Kingdom. It was also successful there, entering and peaking at number four on the UK Singles Chart. "Something" also peaked at number 19 in Australia. In the United States, the song peaked at 35 and was the only Lasgo song to enter on the US main chart besides "Alone", which peaked at 83.

Music video
As the song became more popular throughout Europe, the group made a music video, with the on location filmed scenery of the Prague main railway station.

Track listings

Belgian CD single
 "Something" (radio mix) – 3:41
 "Something" (extended mix) – 5:56
 "Something" (Jimmy Goldschmitz Remix) – 6:05
 "Something" (Peter Luts Remix) – 7:41

European CD single
 "Something" (radio mix) – 3:41
 "Something" (Jimmy Goldschmitz Remix) – 6:05

UK CD single
 "Something" (radio edit) – 3:39
 "Something" (Flip & Fill Remix) – 6:47
 "Something" (Mirco de Govia Remix) – 7:33
 "Something" (video)

UK 12-inch single
A1. "Something" (extended mix) – 5:56
A2. "Something" (Flip & Fill Remix) – 6:35
AA1. "Something" (W.O.S.P. Remix) – 7:27

UK cassette single
 "Something" (radio edit) – 3:39
 "Something" (Flip & Fill Remix) – 6:47
 "Something" (extended mix) – 5:56

US CD single
 "Something" (radio edit)
 "Something" (extended mix)
 "Something" (W.O.S.P. Remix)
 "Something" (Peter Luts Remix)
 "Something" (Jimmy Goldschmitz Remix)

Australian and New Zealand CD single
 "Something" (radio edit)
 "Something" (extended mix)
 "Something" (Jimmy Goldschmitz Remix)
 "Something" (Peter Luts Remix)
 "Something" (bonus video)

Charts

Weekly charts

Year-end charts

Certifications

Release history

References

2001 debut singles
2001 songs
Lasgo songs
Positiva Records singles
Songs written by Peter Luts